James Watson Abrines (1900 – 1976) was a footballer who played in the English Football League for Barrow. He previously played for Parkhead and Albion Rovers.

References

Albion Rovers F.C. players
Barrow A.F.C. players
People from Renfrew
Scottish Football League players
Scottish Junior Football Association players
English Football League players
1900 births
1976 deaths
Footballers from Renfrewshire
Parkhead F.C. players
Association football inside forwards
Scottish footballers